Yevhen Murashov (born 9 May 1995) is a professional Ukrainian football striker.

Career
Murashov is a product of the youth team systems of FC Kremin and FC Shakhtar. In July 2013 he signed a contract with FC Chornomorets and made his debut for FC Chornomorets in a game against FC Dnipro Dnipropetrovsk on 3 May 2015 in the Ukrainian Premier League.

References

External links

Profile at FFU Official Site (Ukr)

1995 births
Living people
Ukrainian footballers
FC Chornomorets Odesa players
Ukrainian Premier League players
FC Guria Lanchkhuti players
FC Zhemchuzhyna Odesa players
PFC Sumy players
FC Kremin Kremenchuk players
Ukrainian expatriate footballers
Expatriate footballers in Georgia (country)
Ukrainian expatriate sportspeople in Georgia (country)
Association football forwards
Ukrainian Second League players